Michael Dilley (born 12 April 1970) is a South African former cricketer. He played in two List A matches for Border in 1991/92 and 1992/93.

See also
 List of Border representative cricketers

References

External links
 

1970 births
Living people
South African cricketers
Border cricketers
People from Queenstown, South Africa
Cricketers from the Eastern Cape